French Polynesian American are Americans with French Polynesian ancestry. The number of French Polynesian Americans is unknown. According to the 2010 US census, there were 5,062 people whose origins are in Tahiti, but other origins of the French Polynesia were not mentioned. While others 9,153 people asserted be of Polynesian origins, but they indicated no specific origin.

History 

Between 1800s and 1860s, Pacific Islander sailors arrived in the United States. Some of them were Tahitians, who settled in Massachusetts and later California. In 1889, the first Polynesian Mormon colony was founded in Utah and consisted of Tahitians, Native Hawaiians, Samoans, and Māori people. 

During the 20th century, the annual number of French Polynesians who moved to the US was small but with certain growth between the 1950 and 70s. So, while in 1954 just three French Polynesians arrived in the United States, in 1956 entry of 14 French Polynesian immigrants it was recorded and in 1965 were admitted other 49 people of same origin.

However, since the 1970s, the number of French Polynesians admitted each year was more varied: So, in 1975, the number of admissions was reduced compared to previous years, because only 47 people of this origin were admitted. Also in 1984 were admitted 59 French Polynesians, a number that was reduced to 19 people of same origin in 1986. For its part, in 1991 it was registered that 31 French Polynesians emigrated to US with legal status in this year and, in 1997, other 21 French Polynesians obtained the admission for live in US.

Culture and Demography
Tahitian Americans celebrate the French Polynesian celebration of Bastille Day on July 14. This date is known as France's independence day in French-speaking countries.

Half of Tahitian Americans reside in the state of Hawaii. Hawaii's population is 0.2% Tahitian.

Notable people 
 Vaitiare Bandera, actress
 Frank Grouard, Scout and interpreter in the American Indian Wars
 Conrad Hall, cinematographer
 Cole Hikutini, American football player

References 

American people of French Polynesian descent
Oceanian American
Pacific Islands American
Polynesian American